The 1952 United States presidential election in Rhode Island took place on November 4, 1952, as part of the 1952 United States presidential election which was held throughout all contemporary 48 states. Voters chose four representatives, or electors to the Electoral College, who voted for president and vice president.

Rhode Island voted for the Republican nominee, General Dwight D. Eisenhower of New York, over the Democratic nominee, former Governor Adlai Stevenson of Illinois. Eisenhower ran with Senator Richard Nixon of California, while Stevenson's running mate was Senator John Sparkman of Alabama.

Eisenhower won Rhode Island by a very narrow margin of 1.85%. As a result of this, he became the first Republican candidate since Calvin Coolidge in 1924 to win the state.

Results

By county

See also
 United States presidential elections in Rhode Island

References

Rhode Island
1952
1952 Rhode Island elections